Hariharalaya (Hariharalay) was an ancient city and capital of the Khmer empire located near Siem Reap, Cambodia in an area now called Roluos (Khmer: រលួស).  Today, all that remains of the city are the ruins of several royal temples: Preah Ko, the Bakong, Lolei.

Etymology

The name "Hariharalaya" is derived from the name of Harihara, a Hindu deity prominent in pre-Angkorian Cambodia.  The name "Harihara" in turn is a composite of "Hari" (one of Vishnu's names listed in Vishnu sahasranama) and "Hara" (meaning the Hindu god Shiva).  Cambodian representations of Harihara were of a male deity whose one side bore the attributes of Vishnu and whose other side bore the attributes of Shiva. For example, the deity’s head-covering consisted of a mitre-type hat (the attribute of Vishnu) on one side and as twisted locks of hair (the attribute of Shiva) on the other. Alaya is a sanskrit word meaning "temple," or "home," so Hariharalaya can mean the home of the deity Harihara or the home of a temple dedicated to the deity Harihara.

History

Toward the end of the 8th century A.D., the Cambodian king Jayavarman II conquered vast territories near the great lake Tonle Sap.  For at least part of this time, he established his capital at Hariharalaya.  However, when he declared himself the universal monarch of the country in 802 A.D., he did so not at Hariharalaya, but at Mahendraparvata on the Phnom Kulen Plateau.  Later, he returned the capital to Hariharalaya, where he died in 835.

Jayavarman II was succeeded by Jayavarman III and then by Indravarman I, who were responsible for the completion of the royal temple mountain known as the Bakong and the construction of Indratataka baray. Indravarman I consecrated the temple’s dominant religious symbol, a lingam called Sri Indresvara (the name is a combination of the king’s name with that of Shiva), in 881.  Indravarman I also constructed the much smaller temple today called Preah Ko ("Sacred Bull"), dedicated in 880.  In 889, Indravarman I was succeeded by his son Yasovarman I, who constructed the temple of Lolei (the name may be a modern corruption of "Hariharalaya") on an artificial island in the middle of Indratataka.  Yasovarman also founded a new city at the site of Angkor Thom north of modern Siem Reap and called it Yasodharapura. Yasovarman made the new city his capital and constructed a new royal temple mountain, known as the Bakheng.  Yasodharapura was to survive until the 1170s when it was sacked by invaders from Champa.

See also
 Angkor
 Architecture of Cambodia
 Preah Ko
 Bakong
 Lolei

References
 Freeman, Michael and Jacques, Claude. Ancient Angkor. River Books. 2006. .
 Falser, Michael. The Pre-Angkorian Temple of Preah Ko. A Sourcebook of the History, Construction and Ornamentation of the Preah Ko Style. White Lotos Publication. Bangkok 2006. (200 pages)

Footnotes

Hindu temples in Cambodia
Archaeological sites in Cambodia
Former populated places in Cambodia
Buildings and structures in Banteay Meanchey province
800s
1st millennium in Cambodia